Sociedad Deportiva Navarro Club de Fútbol is a football team based in Valliniello, Avilés in the autonomous community of Asturias. Founded in 1980, the team plays in Tercera División – Group 2. The club's home ground is Tabiella, which has a capacity of 2,000 spectators.

Season to season

 20 seasons in Tercera División
1 season in Tercera División RFEF

Women's team
The women's team was created in 2018.

References

External links
 Official website 
 Futbolme.com profile 

Football clubs in Asturias
Association football clubs established in 1980
Sport in Avilés
1980 establishments in Spain